Liquid Television was an animation showcase that appeared on MTV from 1991 to 1995. It has served as the launching point for several high-profile original cartoons, including Beavis and Butt-Head and Æon Flux. The bulk of Liquid Television's material was created by independent animators and artists specially for the show, and some previously produced segments were compiled from festivals such as Spike and Mike's Festival of Animation.

The first season of Liquid Television also aired on BBC Two in co-production with MTV. Ultimately, MTV commissioned three seasons of the show, which was produced by Colossal Pictures. The show was eventually succeeded by Cartoon Sushi. Mark Mothersbaugh composed the show's theme music.  

The show was broadcast in Canada on MuchMusic, in Asia on Channel V, in Australia on SBS and in New Zealand on TV3.

History

There were also a large number of animation pieces adapted from the work of Art Spiegelman's comic compilation, RAW. RAW featured underground cartoonists such as Mark Beyer, Richard Sala, and Peter Bagge. In particular, Dog-Boy by Charles Burns was based on the artist's series from RAW.

Due to the extensive use of licensed music throughout the series (episodes often began with a contemporary music video being "liquified"), full episodes of Liquid Television have not been seen in any form since its original run.  Selected segments from the series, including the first appearances of Æon Flux, were released on two VHS tapes in the late 1990s as The Best of Liquid Television parts one and two. These tapes are long out-of-print. A collection volume,  titled Wet Shorts (The Best of Liquid Television), comprising the two VHS tapes, was released on DVD in 1997, but this, too, is out-of-print.

Series credits
 Japhet Asher – Executive Producer/Creative Director
 Prudence Fenton – Executive Producer/Story Editor
 Mark Mothersbaugh – Composer, Theme Music
  XAOS Inc.  – Title Sequences, Liquid Lips, Liquid Eyes, End Credits Bed
 A BIG Pictures &  Noyes & Laybourne Collaboration
 Produced by (Colossal) Pictures for MTV & BBC-TV

Series overview

Episodes

Season 1 (1991)

Season 2 (1992)

Season 3 (1993–95)

Liquid Television Online

Recurring segments
Winter Steele – A puppet show about a biker chick searching for her long-lost love  (see below).
Soap Opera – A parody of daytime soaps, with bars of soap as the actors.
Cut-Up Camera – A parody of Candid Camera involving outrageous situations.
Miss Lidia's Makeover to the Stars – A short about an unseen makeup artist (with live-action hands) who gives celebrities mock make-overs via her computer.
Invisible Hands – About a turban-clad sleuth who solves murders.
Buzz Box – A short with changing patterns set to rock music.
Stick Figure Theatre – A series of shorts recreating scenes from popular movies using stick-figures drawn on 3 × 5 cards.
Dangerous Puppets – About two puppets who violently destroy each other.
The Art School Girls of Doom – A live-action short in the early 1990s about two art school girls. Codie Field and Gina Varla Vetro, transgender actresses, played the girls in an animated environment.
Footworks – Stories featuring footprints as the characters.
Æon Flux – About a scantily-clad female secret agent (later spun off into its own series; also adapted into a 2005 live-action film starring Charlize Theron). The series later became part of Liquid Television's online version in 2012.
Beavis and Butt-Head – About two adolescent morons who cause their own trouble; later spun off into its own series.
Psychogram – A series of stories told with postcards and voiceover narration.
The Specialists – A 10-episode series about three private detectives.
Dog Boy – A live-action, comic book-style story about the adventures of a young man who received a dog's heart in a medical transplant.
The Adventures of Thomas and Nardo – A computer animated series about a man and his anthropomorphic house done in a 3D paper-style, created by Mark Beyer. It had an original soundtrack composed by The Residents.
Speedbump the Roadkill Possum – About a possum who often gets run over.
Was (Not Was) – A series of fast-paced chalk animations to the tune of songs by the titular band.
Uncle Louie – A series of cut-out animations about an older yet jovial uncle and his young nephew in various adventures.
Bobby & Billy – A series of cut-out animations, drawn similar to Norman Rockwell paintings, about two younger boys who display malevolence and immoral behavior in various situations. The cartoon often satirizes indecency set in the 1960.
 Brickface & Stucco – A live-action series about two grease monkeys and their custom hot rod gear head adventures.
Brad Dharma: Psychedelic Detective – An animated series about a psychic private detective in the future megacity of Timbuktu. It mixed cyberpunk and fantasy tropes.

Winter Steele
Winter Steele is a puppet television series created by Cintra Wilson that aired as a segment of Liquid Television during its first two seasons, 1991–1993. Wilson wrote the series, created the puppets, did the voice of the main character and even did some live action body double work.

Winter Steele is depicted as a female biker who is in hot pursuit of her childhood friend, lover and sometime nemesis David "Crow" Dickerson, himself a biker. The two met as children in a repressive orphanage and bonded.  Separated, the two vowed to find each other, with Winter criss-crossing the land on a motorcycle.  In this course Winter breaks many laws - robbing a crossdresser at gunpoint, credit card fraud, etc. As it transpires, Crow is also desperately looking for Winter, he has gotten a career as a stunt performer a la Evel Knievel and a cape he uses in his act bears the inscription "Winter, where are you?" At one point Winter even meets up with Crow's mother, who abandoned her son to an orphanage. Asked if she regretted sending Crow there, she tersely replies "Hell no!"

Winter eventually learns of Crow's career as a daredevil, but despairs of reaching him when she can't get his attention at a show.  Defeated, Winter attempts suicide by immolation, wrecking her motorcycle, tearing off her clothes and setting them on fire. She is stopped when a private detective hired by Crow recognizes her. But before he can bring her to Crow, he sees Winter's burnt belongings and assumes she has committed suicide. He attempts suicide himself by ramming his chopper into a brick wall, but though seriously injured he is not killed. Winter finally catches up with Crow at the intensive care unit at the hospital, but is taken away by the police on various charges before she can stay long.  After the police have taken her away, we see Crow raise a thumb towards Winter.

Revival

On October 13, 2011, MTVX, MTV's cross media group, announced the return of Liquid Television. It is now a network that is available on the internet and social media. The first content to debut on the network was "F**KING BEST SONG EVERRR" by Wallpaper, available on the website. Full-length episodes featuring the online content and all-new material were released in 2013.

Shows on LiquidTelevision.com
 The Head - Animated series about the adventures of a young man who has an alien hatch out of his head.
 The Maxx - Animated adaptation of comic book series The Maxx, the story follows the dual-reality adventures and struggles of the Maxx and his social worker Julie. Aired on MTV's Oddities, which was a sub-category of Liquid Television in the 1990s.
 Daria - Focuses on Daria Morgendorffer, a smart, acerbic, and somewhat misanthropic teenage girl who observes the world around her. Spin-off of Beavis and Butt-Head.
 Wonder Showzen - Live-action/animated sketch comedy series about a darkly perverse kids' show modeled after Sesame Street.
 Celebrity Deathmatch - Clay animation series featuring overly violent wrestling matches between celebrities. Originally part of LT's follow-up, Cartoon Sushi.

See also
Adult Swim
Cartoon Sushi
Exposure
Nicktoons Film Festival
Eye Drops
KaBlam!
Off the Air
Raw Toonage
What A Cartoon! 
Random! Cartoons
Too Cool! Cartoons
GO! Cartoons
Oh Yeah! Cartoons 
Spike and Mike's Festival of Animation
Short Circutz

References

Further reading 
Aero Flux [videorecording]: The Complete Animated Collection. Peter Chung; Howard E. Baker; Denise Poirier: John Rafter Lee; MTV Networks; Paramount Home Entertainment. c2005. 3 videodiscs.
Lipton. Lauren. High-Tech MTV; "Liquid Television" shows what visual wizards can do with animation and pop culture." Los Angeles Times, June 9, 1991 TV Times Orange County Edition, p 8.
Liquid Television. By: LIGHTBODY, KIM, Fast Company, 10859241, Nov2017, Issue 220
Wet Shorts [videorecording]: The Best of Liquid Television. MTV Networks: SMV Enterprises. New York, NY:MTV Networks c1997 videodisc (90 min)

External links
 Official homepage of Liquid Television
 

 
1990s American adult animated television series
1990s American anthology television series
1991 American television series debuts
1995 American television series endings
American adult animation anthology series
English-language television shows
MTV cartoons
American television shows featuring puppetry
American television series with live action and animation